Plagianthus divaricatus or saltmarsh ribbonwood is a plant that is endemic to New Zealand. The Māori name is makaka.

Plagianthus divaricatus is an upright shrub with closely interwoven branches. The shrub is found in coastal environments in areas with salt swamp, sandy banks and throughout estuaries.

References

Malveae
Flora of New Zealand